The Interceptor is a British motorcycle made by Royal Enfield between 1960 and 1970. The 700 Interceptor introduced in 1960 was a modified version of the company's  Constellation model. In 1962, the company introduced the 750 Interceptor which evolved constantly until the end of production in 1970. In 2018, the Interceptor model was reintroduced as a  parallel twin.

700 Interceptor

In 1960, Royal Enfield introduced the first motorcycle bearing the name Interceptor. It had a tuned version of the company's biggest engine, the 692 cc vertical-twin and was only sold in the US and Canada. All engines had the engine prefix letters "VAX" and so these are often referred as "VAX Interceptors". It may be noted that the then flagship 692 cc Constellation had the VA engine prefix(on the US export model) and "X" was added to denote that Interceptor had an experimental engine. They had twin carburettors, except for some early bikes, a factory lightened and balanced crankshaft, hot "R" cams, Lucas racing magneto with manual advance and a few other weight saving modifications compared to other Royal Enfield models. There was also an Interceptor "S" (Sports) model with "highway trim"—quick detachable (QD) lights etc., offered when Enfield failed to sell sufficient quantities of bikes in the standard scrambler trim. A total of 158 692 cc Interceptors were made as per the Redditch factory despatch ledgers held by the Royal Enfield Owners Club in the UK. All of these machines should have been stamped with the VAX prefixed engine numbers. The maximum possible quantity of 692 cc VAX Interceptors is 170. The first bikes left the factory in December 1959, and the last ones were despatched in July 1961.

Series 1 Interceptor

Royal Enfield introduced their all new 736 cc twin cylinder engine in 1962 on the 750 Interceptor. The new engine was similar to the 692 cc engine; but there was hardly any part that was not modified or improved. The engine cases were beefed up to withstand the increased torque. What sets this engine apart from other contemporary British twins is that the crankshaft was dynamically balanced from the factory which made these bikes one of the smoothest British twin engines ever. The Series 1 bikes had an automatic advance magneto and a new seat. There was a rare single carburettor model as well. It was manufactured until 1966.

Series 1A Interceptor

The Series 1A Interceptor was introduced in 1967, with two sub models GP7 and TT7. The major change was the introduction of coil ignition, eliminating the magneto. The US models received a new chrome tank, a new seat, instrument mounts, handlebar, and mudguards.  All S1A interceptors had twin Mark 1 Amal carburettors.

Series 2 Interceptor

The Series 2 Interceptor engine was a major redesign of the Series 1A engine. It included a wet sump engine to improve oil flow to the crankshaft. The CB points were moved to the end of exhaust camshaft and the timing cover was redesigned accordingly. This engine was used on the Interceptor until the end of production in 1970. This engine was later used on Rickman Interceptor and Clymer Enfields.

Series 3 prototype

Royal Enfield made a prototype Series 3 Interceptor to replace the Series 2. However, the factory closed down before mass production was realised.

2018 Interceptor 650 Parallel Twin

In November 2017 at EICMA, Royal Enfield debuted a new parallel twin, the Interceptor 650.  The modern bike was unveiled by Royal Enfield CEO, Siddhartha Lal and President, Rudratej Singh. Powered by a new air-oil cooled  650 cc parallel twin engine, the new Interceptor draws heavily on its 1960s design heritage.. Like the original Interceptor, the new motorcycle has a tubular cradle frame. The teardrop tank features traditional Royal Enfield badges and a Monza-style fuel cap.

Potential Royal Enfield V-twin
The UK weekly Motor Cycle News reported in November 2018 that Royal Enfield has just produced a "concept bike" that echoes a much earlier model. The new bike was called the "Concept KX 838 V-twin", and has the appearance of a "bagger". Painted entirely in black and presumably 838cc, it features girder forks, softail suspension, and a single-sided swingarm. Royal Enfield has claimed that the bike is no more than a "concept", but according to MCN the bike appears to be "production-ready".

References

 Royal Enfield Interceptor Owners Knowledge Base

Interceptor
Motorcycles introduced in 1960
Standard motorcycles
Motorcycles powered by straight-twin engines